Russula obscura is a species of fungus in the genus Russula.

External links
 

obscura
Fungi of Europe
Edible fungi